Bluffton may refer to:

Places in Canada
Bluffton, Alberta

Places in the United States
 Bluffton, Alabama
 Bluffton, Arkansas
 Bluffton Colony, a part of Muskegon, Michigan, which included a colony of vaudeville actors, including Buster Keaton.
 Bluffton, Georgia
 Bluffton, Indiana
 Bluffton, Minnesota
 Bluffton, Ohio
Bluffton University
 Bluffton, Texas
 Bluffton, South Carolina
 Bluffton Township, Minnesota

Other
Bluffton Movement, 1844, South Carolina political group